Dentimargo somalicus is a species of sea snail, a marine gastropod mollusk in the family Marginellidae, the margin snails.

References

 Cossignani T. (2001) Descrizione di dieci nuove marginelle (Gastropoda: Prosobranchia, Marginellidae e Cystiscidae) della provincia Indo-Pacifica. Malacologia Mostra Mondiale 35: 3–11
 Cossignani T. (2006). Marginellidae & Cystiscidae of the World. L'Informatore Piceno. 408pp.

Marginellidae
Gastropods described in 2001